Punčec is a surname. Notable people with the surname include:
 
 Franjo Punčec (1913–1985), Croatian tennis player
 Frank Punčec (born 1951), South African tennis player
 Roberto Punčec (born 1991), Croatian footballer
 

Croatian surnames